Four classes of frigate of the Royal Navy have been named the Amazon class:

The  frigates of 1773, made up of 32-gun fifth rates with a main battery of 12-pounder guns, it comprised eighteen ships; Amazon, Ambuscade and Thetis were launched in 1773; the second batch – Cleopatra, Amphion, Orpheus, Juno, Success, Iphigenia, Andromache, Syren, Iris, Greyhound, Meleager, Solebay,  and Blonde – were launched in 1779 to 1787
The  frigates of 1795 consisted of four 36-gun fifth rates with a main battery of 18-pounder guns: Amazon and  launched in 1795, and Trent and  launched in 1796; Trent and Glenmore were constructed of "fir" (Pitch pine)
The Amazon-class frigates, or Type 21 frigates, comprising eight ships – Amazon, Antelope, Active, Ambuscade, Arrow, Alacrity, Ardent and Avenger – launched from 1971 to 1975

See also 
List of frigate classes of the Royal Navy

Frigates of the Royal Navy